Nepanagar Assembly constituency is one of the 230 constituencies in the Madhya Pradesh Legislative Assembly of Madhya Pradesh a central state of India. Nepanagar is also part of Khandwa Lok Sabha constituency. It is a reserved seat for the Scheduled Tribe (ST).

Members of Legislative Assembly
 1977: Brijmohan Mishra, Janata Party
 1980: Tanwant Singh Keer, Indian National Congress (I)
 1985: Tanwant Singh Keer, Indian National Congress
 1990: Brijmohan Mishra, Bharatiya Janata Party
 1993: Tanwant Singh Keer, Indian National Congress
 1998: Raghunath, Indian National Congress 
 2003: Archana Chitnis, Bharatiya Janata Party
 2008: Rajendra Shyamlal Dadu, Bharatiya Janata Party
 2013: Rajendra Shyamlal Dadu, Bharatiya Janata Party
 2016: Manju Dadu, Bharatiya Janata Party
 2018: Sumitra Devi Kasdekar, Indian National Congress
 2020 (by election): Sumitra Devi Kasdekar, Bharatiya Janata Party

Election results

2018

2013

See also
 Nepanagar
 List of constituencies of Madhya Pradesh Legislative Assembly
 Burhanpur district

References

Assembly constituencies of Madhya Pradesh
Burhanpur district